Eumegistus is a small genus of pomfrets found in the Atlantic and Pacific oceans.

Species
There are currently two recognized species in this genus:
 Eumegistus brevorti (Poey, 1860) (Tropical pomfret)
 Eumegistus illustris D. S. Jordan & E. K. Jordan, 1922 (Brilliant pomfret)

References

Bramidae
Taxa named by David Starr Jordan